Thomas Duffy may refer to:

Thomas Duffy (VC) (1805–1858), Irish recipient of the Victoria Cross in 1857
Thomas A. Duffy (1906–1979), New York politician and judge
Thomas C. Duffy (born 1955), American composer and conductor of the Yale University Concert Band
Thomas J. Duffy, American designer/craftsman
Thomas F. Duffy (born 1955), American actor
Thomas T. Duffy (1835–?), American politician

See also

Thomas Gavan-Duffy (1867–1932), Irish trade unionist and politician